Timir Nandy is a Bangladeshi singer who mainly sings romantic songs and patriotic songs. He has lent his voice to popular songs such as "Ogo Chand Kothay Peyechho Eto Alo", " Tomare Legechhe Eto Je Bhalo", "Monobeena Te Roye Roye", " Jhor Jhor Baridhara Sondhay", "Chander Pane Cheye Cheye", " Badhon Khule Dilam". He completed 50 years of his career in 2019 and dropped an album titled Meghla Du Chokh for celebrating silver jubilee of his career.

Career
Timir started his career in 1969 on Bangladesh Television and radio. In 1971, he participated in Bangladesh Liberation War as a freedom fighter. After Independence, He was admitted to Dhaka music college. In 1972, he formed a cultural organisation named Rajani along with some of his friends in Dhaka. In this period, he started composing music, with some of his composed tunes penned by his friends from Rajani musical group. In BTV's serial Shonkito Podojatra, his composed a song titled "Badhon khule dilam" which got immense popularity at that time. 

In 1973, while studying there, he bagged a scholarship from Soviet Union government to complete higher studies in Soviet Russia. He thus became the first ever Bangladeshi to complete higher studies in music from Europe. He shifted to Soviet Union and completed his higher studies. In the late-1970s, he returned to Bangladesh and took up music as a career. He earned a niche for himself through numerous hit songs in films, television and radio. 

In 2009, He completed 40 years in music. He published am album after a long hiatus to commemorate this achievement. In 2019,he published another album called Meghla Duchokh to celebrate 50 years of his career.  In 2020, He took an initiative to compose songs for the new generation's singers on request of regional director of Bangladesh Betar, Syed Mostafa Kamal. He has mainly worked on patriotic and modern songs. Those songs have been penned by Rongu Shahabuddin, Md Rafiqul Hasan, Khokon Sirajul Islam, Ayet Hossain Ujjal and Salma Akter while Linu Billah, Mokhlesul Islam Nilu, Jinat Rehana, Tanveer Alam Sajeeb, Shahnaz Rahman Shikriti, Chhonda Chakraborty, Shorolipi, Sondipon, Ronti Das, Nishita Barua, Champa Banik, Shahina Haque, Himadri Biswas, Muhin, Priyanka Gope, Rajib, Rebeka Sultana have sung these patriotic songs.

Discography

Studio albums

References

1957 births
Living people
Bangladeshi playback singers
20th-century Bangladeshi male singers
20th-century Bangladeshi singers
21st-century Bangladeshi male singers
21st-century Bangladeshi singers
People from Dhaka